John Howard Payne (May 23, 1912 – December 6, 1989) was an American film actor who is mainly remembered from film noir crime stories and 20th Century Fox musical films, and for his leading roles in Miracle on 34th Street and the NBC Western television series The Restless Gun.

Early life
Payne was born in Roanoke, Virginia. His mother, Ida Hope (née Schaeffer), a singer, graduated from the Virginia Seminary in Roanoke and married George Washington Payne, a developer in Roanoke. They lived at Fort Lewis, an antebellum mansion that became a state historic property, but was destroyed by fire in the late 1940s.

Payne attended prep school at Mercersburg Academy in Mercersburg, Pennsylvania, and then went to Roanoke College in Salem, Virginia. He then transferred to Columbia University in New York City in the fall of 1930. He studied drama at Columbia and voice at the Juilliard School. To support himself, he took on a variety of odd jobs, including wrestling as "Alexei Petroff, the Savage of the Steppes" and boxing as "Tiger Jack Payne".

He returned frequently to visit his family in Roanoke, Virginia.

Acting career

Stage actor
In 1934, a talent scout for the Shubert theaters spotted Payne and gave him a job as a stock player. He appeared in road company productions of Rose-Marie and The Student Prince at $40 a week.

Payne toured with several Shubert Brothers shows, and frequently sang on New York City-based radio programs.  On Broadway he appeared in the revue At Home Abroad (1935–36) alongside Ethel Waters, Eleanor Powell and Beatrice Lillie. He understudied for Reginald Gardiner and took over one night. He was seen by Fred Kohlmar of Sam Goldwyn's company and was offered a movie contract.

Early films
In 1936, he left New York for Hollywood. His first role was in Goldwyn's Dodsworth, playing Harry McKee, the son-in-law of Walter Huston's titular character.

He had the male lead as Jimmy Maxwell in Hats Off (1936), an independent film.

Payne was third billed in Fair Warning (1937), at Fox, and was the lead in Love on Toast (1937). He had a small role in Paramount's College Swing (1938).

Warner Bros
Payne signed a contract with Warner Bros. and played Don Vincent in Garden of the Moon (1938). He was in Kid Nightingale (1939) and Wings of the Navy (1939). Payne supported Ann Sheridan in Indianapolis Speedway (1939).

During this time he returned to Broadway to appear in Abe Lincoln in Illinois (1938–39). Payne was unhappy with his Warner Bros. roles, and asked for a release.

20th Century Fox
Payne went to 20th Century Fox where he appeared in Star Dust (1940). During filming, Darryl F. Zanuck offered him a long-term contract.

He had supporting roles in Maryland (1940) and The Great Profile (1940).

Payne had roles in the comedy The Great American Broadcast (1940), and was in the musicals Tin Pan Alley (1940), Week-End in Havana (1941) and Sun Valley Serenade (1941).

Fox gave him the chance to do drama in Remember the Day (1941) and To the Shores of Tripoli (1942).

After serving in the military during World War II Payne returned to Fox, and was in The Dolly Sisters (1945), playing Harry Fox. It was one of Payne's most successful films.

Payne starred with Maureen O'Hara in Sentimental Journey (1946), and was in The Razor's Edge (1946).

Payne's most familiar role may be his final film for Fox, that of attorney Fred Gailey in the classic holiday favorite Miracle on 34th Street (1947) with Natalie Wood, Maureen O'Hara and Edmund Gwenn. It was another box office success. He was meant to make another with O'Hara, Sitting Pretty (1948) . However, in October 1947 he got his release from the studio, despite the contract having another four years to run, which would have brought him $670,000. Payne claimed he was dissatisfied with the roles being offered him.

Payne later said he had asked for his release every week for eight months before he got it. Film historian Jeanine Basinger later wrote that "Fox thought of [Payne] as a secondary Tyrone Power. They didn't know how to use him."

Freelance actor
After leaving Fox, Payne attempted to change his image and began playing tough-guy roles in Hollywood films noir.

He did two noirs at Universal, Larceny (1948), where he played the lead role, and was in The Saxon Charm (1948). He had the lead in The Crooked Way (1949) for United Artists.

Pine-Thomas Productions
Payne received an offer to star in a Western for Pine-Thomas Productions, a unit that operated out of Paramount Studios. His first film for the company was El Paso (1949). Other roles were in Captain China (1950), an adventure film; Tripoli (1950) set during the Barbary War; and The Eagle and the Hawk (1950), a Western.

He signed a contract to make three more films for Pine-Thomas and was in Passage West (1951), another Western; and Crosswinds (1951), an adventure film; Caribbean Gold (1952), a pirate film; The Blazing Forest (1952), an adventure story; The Vanquished (1952), a Western.

Payne insisted that the films he appeared in be filmed in color and that the rights to the films revert to him after several years, making him wealthy when he rented them to television.

In 1952 he said he got four times the fan mail he did at Fox. "I make fewer pictures now but I make the kind I want to make."

Other independent producers

Payne starred in Kansas City Confidential (1952), a noir, and owned 25% of the film. He later worked with on Raiders of the Seven Seas (1953), a pirate movie; and 99 River Street (1953), a noir.

Payne did a series of Westerns: Silver Lode (1954), for Benedict Bogeaus; Rails Into Laramie (1955), for Universal; Santa Fe Passage (1955) and The Road to Denver (1955) at Republic, and Tennessee's Partner (1955) for Bogeaus.

In 1955, he paid a $1,000-a-month option for nine months on the Ian Fleming James Bond novel Moonraker (he eventually gave up the option when he learned he could not retain the rights for the entire book series).

He returned to Pine-Thomas for a noir, Hell's Island (1956), then did Slightly Scarlet (1956) for Bogeaus. He made Hold Back the Night (1956) for Allied Artists and The Boss (1956) for United Artists, co-producing the latter. He did another noir, Hidden Fear, shot in Denmark. 

Payne made one more Pine-Thomas film, Bailout at 43,000 (1957), playing Major Paul Peterson.

Television
Payne starred as Vint Bonner in The Restless Gun, a half-hour western which aired on NBC Monday evenings from September 23, 1957 to September 14, 1959. He played a gunfighter who preferred not to fight if other options were available. The series was originally based on an earlier radio series starring James Stewart titled The Six Shooter. On October 31, 1957 Payne guest-starred on The Ford Show hosted by Tennessee Ernie Ford.

Later career
Payne directed one of his last films, They Ran for Their Lives (1968), and starred with Alice Faye in a 1974 revival of the musical Good News. He also starred in the Gunsmoke episode of "Gentry's Law" in 1970.

His final role was in 1975, when he co-starred with Peter Falk and Janet Leigh in the Columbo episode "Forgotten Lady". Later in life Payne became wealthy through real estate investments in southern California.

Personal life 

During World War II Payne served as a flight instructor in the United States Army Air Corps. Major Payne received a silver star in 1942 for his actions during a bombing mission of the Italian fleet which allowed British forces to proceed. He was honorably discharged in September 1944.

Payne was married to actress Anne Shirley from 1937 to 1942; they had a daughter, Julie Anne Payne.

He married actress Gloria DeHaven in 1944; the couple had two children, Kathleen Hope Payne (b. 1945) and Thomas John Payne, before divorcing in 1950. The couple remained on good terms, and on June 27, 1961, columnist Earl Wilson wrote that DeHaven was still concerned over Payne's March 1961 accident, and called him once a week.

During the filming of Kansas City Confidential (1952) Payne had a romance with co-star Coleen Gray that continued well past filming. They later appeared together in Tennessee's Partner, alongside future U.S. President Ronald Reagan.

Payne then married Alexandra Beryl "Sandy" Crowell Curtis in 1953, and remained with her until his death.

His oldest daughter, Julie, was married to writer-director Robert Towne from 1977 to 1982.

Payne was a Republican, and in October 1960 he was one of many conservative notables who drove in the Nixon-Lodge Bumper Sticker Motorcade in Los Angeles. Payne also supported Barry Goldwater in the 1964 United States presidential election.

Accident 
On the evening of March 1, 1961, when Payne was 49, he suffered extensive, life-threatening injuries when struck by a car when he was crossing Madison Avenue in New York City. It had been raining, and the driver, future billionaire hedge fund manager Bernard Selz, claimed he had not seen Payne. Payne was tossed into the air, and came down facefirst into the car’s windshield, which then shattered, causing extensive facial lacerations, including damaging both his eyes. His left leg was broken in five places, and he suffered a skull fracture.

Payne was taken to Roosevelt Hospital (now named Mount Sinai West), where he had facial surgery. He was in a hip cast for five-and-a-half months. He claimed his full recovery was due to doctors telling him that a patient’s attitude is important, and he always remained optimistic.

One of Payne's first public appearances during this period was as a guest panelist on the popular CBS Sunday night game show What's My Line? In the December 3, 1961, episode, regular panelist Dorothy Kilgallen introduced Payne by saying, "He's been in the hospital after a very bad accident. So it's good to see him fit as a fiddle and all in one piece." Regular panelist Bennett Cerf remarked, "Good to see you here, John. Glad to see you beat that car on Madison Avenue that bumped into you."

Death
Payne died in Malibu, California, of congestive heart failure on December 6, 1989, aged 77. His ashes were scattered into the Pacific Ocean.

He has two stars on the Hollywood Walk of Fame, in motion pictures and television.

Complete filmography

Radio appearances

References

External links 

 
 
 
 
 
 
 John Payne at Virtual History
 John Payne in Lux Radio Theater: Miracle on 34th Street (1948) – downloadable mp3 and streaming audio

1912 births
1989 deaths
20th-century American businesspeople
20th-century American male actors
20th-century American singers
20th Century Studios contract players
20th-century American male singers
American male film actors
American male radio actors
American male television actors
American male voice actors
California Republicans
Columbia University alumni
First Motion Picture Unit personnel
Juilliard School alumni
Male actors from Los Angeles
Male actors from Virginia
Male Western (genre) film actors
Military personnel from Virginia
People from Roanoke, Virginia
Roanoke College alumni
Vaudeville performers
Virginia Republicans
Warner Bros. contract players